FC Industriya Borovsk was a Russian football team from Borovsk. It played professionally from 1993 to 1997. Their best result was 4th place in Zone 4 of the Russian Second League in 1993.

Team name and location history
 1992–1994 FC Obninsk
 1995 FC Industriya Obninsk
 1996–1997 FC Industriya Borovsk

When the team moved to Borovsk, a new team was organized in Obninsk called FC Obninsk. That team played in the Russian Third League in 1996 and Russian Second Division in 2004. It was replaced in the Second Division by FC Zvezda Serpukhov in 2005.

External links
  Team history at KLISF

Association football clubs established in 1991
Association football clubs disestablished in 1998
Defunct football clubs in Russia
Sport in Kaluga Oblast
1991 establishments in Russia
1998 disestablishments in Russia